Mandalay is a coastal locality in the Whitsunday Region, Queensland, Australia.

Geography 
Mandalay is mostly mountainous undeveloped terrain except for some lowland in the south-west of the locality. The residential development is predominantly in the lowland area or along the north-west coast accessed via Mandalay Road. Shute Harbour Road forms the southern boundary of the locality. The northernmost and southernmost parts of the locality are within the Conway National Park.

The Proserpine–Shute Harbour Road (State Route 59) passes through the locality from south to east.

History 
Mandalay comprises part of the former locality of Jubilee. The name Mandalay presumably derives from the name of its northern headland Mandalay Point, which in turn is believed to be named by George Sax who resided at the point for about ten years from 1937.

Amenities 
The Whitsunday Sports Park (also known as the Airlie Sports Park) is in the most western part of the locality on Shute Harbour Road. It has a rectangular and an oval field, netball courts and two clubhouses. It is home to clubs of various codes of football, netball and softball.

References 

Whitsunday Region
Coastline of Queensland
Localities in Queensland